Gnorimoschema penetrans is a moth in the family Gelechiidae. It was described by Povolný in 2003. It is found in North America, where it has been recorded from New Mexico.

References

Gnorimoschema
Moths described in 2003
Taxa named by Dalibor Povolný